Symphyotrichum glabrifolium (formerly Aster glabrifolius and Erigeron glabrifolius) is a species of flowering plant in the family Asteraceae native to Argentina and Chile where it inhabits wet meadows and stream edges. Its flowers have white or lilac ray florets and yellow disk florets.

Citations

References

glabrifolium
Flora of Argentina
Flora of Chile
Plants described in 1836
Taxa named by Augustin Pyramus de Candolle